Silverside is an unincorporated community in New Castle County, Delaware, United States. Silverside is located where Silverside Road crosses under CSX Transportation's Philadelphia Subdivision and Interstate 95, northeast of Wilmington.

References 

Unincorporated communities in New Castle County, Delaware
Unincorporated communities in Delaware